Gökhan Karadeniz (born 2 May 1990) is a Turkish footballer who plays as a midfielder for Boluspor.

Career
With Altınordu he became the top scorer of all Turkish leagues in the 2013–14 season with 27 goals in 33 matches.

References

External links
 
 
 

1990 births
Sportspeople from Bursa
Living people
Turkish footballers
Turkey B international footballers
Association football midfielders
Hatayspor footballers
Karacabey Belediyespor footballers
Aydınspor footballers
Altınordu F.K. players
Trabzonspor footballers
Antalyaspor footballers
Göztepe S.K. footballers
Bandırmaspor footballers
Büyükşehir Belediye Erzurumspor footballers
Samsunspor footballers
Boluspor footballers
Süper Lig players
TFF First League players
TFF Second League players
TFF Third League players